Eosictis is an extinct genus of Miacidae. It was first named by Scott in 1945, and contains one species, Eosictis avinoffi.

Sources
taxonomicon.taxonomy.nl
paleodb.org

Miacids
Eocene mammals of North America
Prehistoric placental genera